Diospyros pentamera is a common rainforest tree in the Ebony or Persimmon family (Ebenaceae) growing from near Batemans Bay (36° S) in New South Wales to the Atherton Tableland (17° S) in tropical Queensland, Australia. It is commonly known as the myrtle ebony, black myrtle, grey plum or grey persimmon.

Description 

Diospyros pentamera is a small to large rainforest tree, from 6 to 40 metres in height at maturity, and 60 centimetres in width at the base. It grows in various types of rainforests, but grows best in volcanic soils in fire free areas with high rainfall.

The leaves are 5 to 9 centimetres long, not toothed. Fragrant white flowers form in spring. The mid-sized edible berry matures around December to February and is eaten by many rainforest birds, including Brown Cuckoo Dove, Wompoo Fruit Dove, Rose-crowned Fruit Dove, Topknot Pigeon, Currawong, Regent Bowerbird and Australasian Figbird. Germination of fresh seed is quick, but occasionally unreliable. This tree is easily identified in the rainforest by the dark rough bark, which resembles the bark of Ironbark trees.

References

External links
 Diospyros pentamera Occurrence data from The Australasian Virtual Herbarium 

pentamera
Flora of New South Wales
Flora of Queensland
Ericales of Australia
Trees of Australia
Taxa named by Ferdinand von Mueller